1967 in sports describes the year's events in world sport.

Alpine skiing
 The first Alpine Skiing World Cup is organised for the three ski events: Downhill, Slalom and Giant Slalom:
 Men's overall champion: Jean-Claude Killy, France
 Women's overall champion: Nancy Greene, Canada

American football
 January 15 − Super Bowl I: the Green Bay Packers (NFL) won 35−10 over the Kansas City Chiefs (AFL)
Location: Los Angeles Memorial Coliseum
Attendance: 61,946
MVP: Bart Starr, QB (Green Bay)
 December 31 – Green Bay Packers defeat Dallas Cowboys 21-17 for the 1967 NFL Championship in a now-legendary game at Lambeau Field known as the Ice Bowl to advance to Super Bowl II in Jan. 1968
 Oakland Raiders defeat the Houston Oilers 40-7 for the 1967 American Football League Championship to advance to Super Bowl II in Jan. 1968
 The New Orleans Saints are formed.

Association football

European Cup
 Celtic win the European Cup Final 2–1 against Internazionale in Lisbon, earning the team the nickname of the Lisbon Lions. The team also won the Scottish League Championship and Scottish Cup and the Scottish league Cup Final, thus becoming the first team to complete a domestic and European quadruple.

England
 FA Cup final – Tottenham Hotspur 2-1 Chelsea

Athletics
 August – Athletics at the 1967 Pan American Games held at Winnipeg

Australian rules football
 Victorian Football League
 Richmond wins the 71st VFL Premiership (Richmond 16.18 (114) d Geelong 15.15 (105))
 Brownlow Medal awarded to Ross Smith (St Kilda)

Bandy

Baseball
 World Series – St. Louis Cardinals  win 4 games to 3 over the Boston Red Sox. The series MVP is pitcher Bob Gibson of St. Louis.
 October – The Kansas City Athletics become the Oakland Athletics for the 1968 season.

Basketball
 NCAA University Division basketball tournament –
 UCLA wins 79–64 over Dayton. This would be the first of a record seven consecutive titles for the Bruins.
 NBA Finals –
 Philadelphia 76ers won 4 games to 2 over the San Francisco Warriors.
 FIBA World Championship
 Champions: USSR
 The American Basketball Association begins play as a rival league to the NBA.

Boxing
 May 9 – Muhammad Ali was stripped of his World Heavyweight Champion  titles and was banned from boxing by the various commissions for his refusal to be inducted into the United States Army.
 October 27 – death of Robert Carmody (29), American boxer, in the Vietnam War

Canadian football
 Grey Cup – Hamilton Tiger-Cats won 24–1 over the Saskatchewan Roughriders
 Vanier Cup – Alberta Golden Bears win 10–9 over the McMaster Marauders

Cycling
 July 30 – death of Valentín Uriona (26), Spanish road racing cyclist, following a crash during a race
 Giro d'Italia won by Felice Gimondi of Italy
 Tour de France – Roger Pingeon of France
 UCI Road World Championships – Men's road race – Eddy Merckx of Belgium

Field hockey
 Pan American Games (Men's Competition) in Winnipeg, Manitoba, Canada
 Gold Medal: Argentina
 Silver Medal: Trinidad & Tobago
 Bronze Medal: United States
 March 11 – In an international women's field-hockey match at Wembley Stadium, England. England beat Ireland 7–1.

Figure skating
 World Figure Skating Championships –
 Men's champion: Emmerich Dänzer, Austria
 Ladies' champion: Peggy Fleming, United States
 Pair skating champions: Ludmila Belousova & Oleg Protopopov, Soviet Union
 Ice dancing champions: Diane Towler & Bernard Ford, Great Britain

Golf
Men's professional
 Masters Tournament – Gay Brewer
 U.S. Open – Jack Nicklaus
 British Open – Roberto DeVicenzo
 PGA Championship – Don January
 PGA Tour money leader – Jack Nicklaus – $188,998
 Ryder Cup – United States wins 23½ to 8½ over Britain in team golf.
Men's amateur
 British Amateur – Bob Dickson
 U.S. Amateur – Bob Dickson
Women's professional
 Women's Western Open – Kathy Whitworth
 LPGA Championship – Kathy Whitworth
 U.S. Women's Open – Catherine Lacoste
 Titleholders Championship – not played
 LPGA Tour money leader – Kathy Whitworth – $32,937

Harness racing
 United States Pacing Triple Crown races –
 Cane Pace – Meadow Paige
 Little Brown Jug – Best Of All
 Messenger Stakes – Romulus Hanover
 United States Trotting Triple Crown races –
 Hambletonian – Speedy Streak
 Yonkers Trot – Speed Model
 Kentucky Futurity – Speed Model
 Australian Inter Dominion Harness Racing Championship –
 Pacers: Binshaw

Horse racing
Steeplechases
 Cheltenham Gold Cup – Woodland Venture
 Grand National – Foinavon
Flat races
 Australia – Melbourne Cup won by Red Handed
 Canada – Queen's Plate won by Jammed Lovely
 France – Prix de l'Arc de Triomphe won by Topyo
 Ireland – Irish Derby Stakes won by Ribocco
 English Triple Crown Races:
 2,000 Guineas Stakes – Royal Palace
 The Derby – Royal Palace
 St. Leger Stakes – Ribocco
 United States Triple Crown Races:
 Kentucky Derby – Proud Clarion
 Preakness Stakes – Damascus
 Belmont Stakes – Damascus

Ice hockey
 Art Ross Trophy as the NHL's leading scorer during the regular season: Stan Mikita, Chicago Black Hawks
 Hart Memorial Trophy – for the NHL's Most Valuable Player: Stan Mikita, Chicago Black Hawks
 Stanley Cup – Toronto Maple Leafs won 4 games to 2 over the Montreal Canadiens
 World Hockey Championship
 Men's champion: Soviet Union defeated Sweden
 NCAA Men's Ice Hockey Championship – Cornell University Big Red defeat Boston University Terriers 4–1 in Syracuse, New York
 The NHL adds six new teams for the 1967–68 season.

Lacrosse
 The inaugural World Lacrosse Championship is held in Toronto, Ontario. The United States win, and Australia is the runner-up.
 The Vancouver Carlings win the Mann Cup.
 The Elora Mohawks win the Castrol Cup.
 The Oshawa Green Gaels win the Minto Cup

Motorsport

Radiosport
 Fifth Amateur Radio Direction Finding European Championship held in Cervena, Czechoslovakia.

Rugby league
1967 New Zealand rugby league season
1967 NSWRFL season
1966–67 Northern Rugby Football League season / 1967–68 Northern Rugby Football League season
 17 December – first Sunday play in professional rugby league.

Rugby union
 73rd Five Nations Championship series is won by France

Snooker
 No World Snooker Championship challenge matches. John Pulman remains world champion

Swimming
 July 26 – American swimmer Mark Spitz breaks Kevin Berry's nearly three-year-old world record in the men's 200m butterfly (long course) at the Pan American Games in Winnipeg, Manitoba, with a time of 2:06.4.
 August 30 – John Ferris captures the world record from fellow-American Mark Spitz in the men's 200m butterfly (long course) by swimming 2:06.0 at a meet in Tokyo, Japan.
 October 8 – Mark Spitz regains his world record in the men's 200m butterfly (long course) at a meet in West Berlin, West Germany, clocking 2:05.7.

Tennis
Australia
 Australian Men's Singles Championship – Roy Emerson (Australia) defeats Arthur Ashe (USA) 6–4, 6–1, 6–4
 Australian Women's Singles Championship – Nancy Richey (USA) defeats Lesley Turner Bowrey (Australia) 6–1, 6–4
England
 Wimbledon Men's Singles Championship – John Newcombe (Australia) defeats Wilhelm Bungert (West Germany) 6–3, 6–1, 6–1
 Wimbledon Women's Singles Championship – Billie Jean King (USA) defeats Ann Haydon-Jones (Great Britain) 6–3, 6–4
France
 French Men's Singles Championship – Roy Emerson (Australia) defeats Tony Roche (Australia) 6–1, 6–4, 2–6, 6–2
 French Women's Singles Championship – Françoise Dürr (France) defeats Lesley Turner (Australia) 4–6, 6–3, 6–4
USA
 American Men's Singles Championship – John Newcombe (Australia) defeats Clark Graebner (USA) 6–4, 6–4, 8–6
 American Women's Singles Championship – Billie Jean King (USA) defeats Ann Haydon Jones (Great Britain) 11–9, 6–4
Davis Cup
 1967 Davis Cup –  4–1  at Milton Courts (grass) Brisbane, Australia

Volleyball
 1967 Men's European Volleyball Championship won by the USSR
 1967 Women's European Volleyball Championship won by the USSR
 Volleyball at the 1967 Pan American Games won by USA (both men's and women's tournaments)

Water sports
 January 4 – death of Donald Campbell (45), British land and water speed record holder, who was trying to extend the record on Coniston Water, Cumbria

Yacht racing
 The New York Yacht Club retains the America's Cup as Intrepid defeats Australian challenger Dame Pattie, of the Royal Sydney Yacht Squadron, 4 races to 1

Multi-sport events
 Fifth Pan American Games held in Winnipeg, Canada
 Fifth Mediterranean Games held in Tunis, Tunisia
 Fifth Summer Universiade held in Tokyo, Japan

Awards
 Associated Press Male Athlete of the Year – Carl Yastrzemski, Major League Baseball
 Associated Press Female Athlete of the Year – Billie Jean King, Tennis

References

 
Sports by year